The N7 road is one of the 7 national roads of Senegal. It connects Ouro Sogui in the north-east of Senegal to Kédougou in the south-east by a route which crosses the Niokolo-Koba National Park.

The road runs in a southerly direction from Ouro Sogui to Tambacounda where it crosses the N1 road before heading south-east, via the Niokolo-Koba National Park, to Kédougou on the borders of Mali and Guinea.

See also
 N1 road
 N2 road
 N3 road
 N4 road
 N5 road
 N6 road
 Transport in Senegal

Road transport in Senegal